The 2014–15 EBU Player of the Year Championship was the competition's first season. Points were accumulated over the EBU's ten most prestigious events from 1 October 2014 to 30 September 2015. David Gold became the inaugural champion.

List of Competitions

Summary of Results

This list displays the top ten players; 134 players received points. Winners of each event are highlighted in bold.

Full Results
Results tables for each event extend only to those pairs or teams that receive championship points, or to the top 10 (including ties) of the field if appropriate.

Gold Cup
16 points were awarded to the champions, 8 to the runners-up, 4 to semi-finalists and 1 to quarter-finalists. Home/away draws and IMP scores for each side were not recorded; By convention, team names are based on the full name of the captain.

Spring Fours
14 points were awarded to the champions, 8 to the runners-up, 4 to semi-finalists and 1 to quarter-finalists. The higher ranked seed is listed first in each case; By convention, team names are based on the surname of the captain.

Premier League (Division 1)
16 points were awarded to the champions, 8 to 2nd place, 4 to 3rd place and 2 to 4th place. 8 teams participated. By convention, team names are based on the surname of the captain.

Crockfords Cup (Finals)
12 points were awarded to the champions, 6 to 2nd place, 4 to 3rd place, 2 to 4th place and 1 to all other finalists (5th to 8th). By convention, team names are based on the surname of the captain.

Four Star Teams (A Final)
8 points were awarded to the champions, 4 to 2nd place, 2 to 3rd place and 1 to 4th place. 8 teams participated. By convention, team names are based on the surname of the captain.

National Point-a-Board Teams (Final)
6 points were awarded to the champions, 3 to 2nd place, 2 to 3rd place and 1 to 4th place. 8 teams participated. By convention, team names are based on the surname of the captain.

Due to a tie for 4th place, both teams received 1 point in the championship standings.

Summer Meeting Swiss Pairs
12 points were awarded to the champions, 6 to 2nd place, 3 to 3rd place, 2 to 4th place and 1 to 5th place. 287 pairs participated of which the top 10 are displayed below. 

Michael Byrne and Kieran Dyke won the trophy on a split-tie decision, but championship points were split equally at 9 each.

National Pairs (Final)
8 points were awarded to the champions, 4 to 2nd place, 2 to 3rd place and 1 to 4th place. 50 pairs participated in the final of which the top 10 are displayed below.

Guardian Trophy
6 points were awarded to the champions, 3 to 2nd place, 2 to 3rd place and 1 to 4th place. 99 pairs participated of which the top 10 are displayed below.

Two Star Pairs (Final)
6 points were awarded to the champions, 3 to 2nd place, 2 to 3rd place and 1 to 4th place. 20 pairs participated in the final of which the top 10 are displayed below.

References

Contract bridge competitions
Contract bridge in the United Kingdom